The eighth term of the Sejm of the Republic of Poland ran from 12 November 2015 until 2019.

Officers

Members of Sejm

See also
 2015 Polish parliamentary election
 List of Polish senators (2015–19)
 List of Sejm members (2011–15), former term

References